Howard V. Thomas (January 18, 1905 – March 17, 1995) was a Canadian wrestler who competed in two Olympic games in 1932 and 1936. He was born in London, England.

Thomas competed in the 1932 Summer Olympics in Men's Freestyle 66 kg and in the 1936 Summer Olympics in same event, but did not win a medal. He won a gold medal in the lightweight division at the 1930 British Empire Games and a bronze medal in the same event at the 1934 British Empire Games. Thomas died in Burlington, Ontario in 1995.

References

External links
 

1905 births
1995 deaths
Sportspeople from London
English emigrants to Canada
Olympic wrestlers of Canada
Wrestlers at the 1932 Summer Olympics
Wrestlers at the 1936 Summer Olympics
Canadian male sport wrestlers
Wrestlers at the 1930 British Empire Games
Wrestlers at the 1934 British Empire Games
Commonwealth Games gold medallists for Canada
Commonwealth Games bronze medallists for Canada
Commonwealth Games medallists in wrestling
20th-century Canadian people
Medallists at the 1930 British Empire Games
Medallists at the 1934 British Empire Games